MGM Macau (formerly known as MGM Grand Macau) is a 35-story, 600-room casino resort in Sé, Macau. Under a sub concession approved by the Macau government, the project is owned and operated as a 50–50 joint venture between MGM Resorts International and Pansy Ho, daughter of Macau casino magnate Stanley Ho.  The sub-concession is one of several examples of new casino construction following the end of the government-granted monopoly held for decades by Stanley Ho.

History 
The MGM Grand Macau was opened on 18 December 2007 at a cost of US$1.25 billion.

The property was renamed to MGM Macau, as part of MGM Mirage's 2010 rebranding to MGM Resorts International.

On 18 April 2011, an initial public offering was announced. Under the agreement, Pansy Ho would receive a 29 percent stake in the company, MGM China Holdings Ltd, which was created as a listing vehicle for the IPO. MGM Resorts would hold 51 percent and the public would receive 20 percent. The company raised US$1.5 billion from its IPO on the Hong Kong Stock Exchange at the top price of the range.

Layout 
Phase One of the casino floor accounts for  square metres over two levels and wrapping around the Grande Praça; with table games and slot machines.

MGM Macau also features a number of restaurant outlets, bars, and lounges. There are 12 food and beverage outlets in total.

Soon after Wynn Macau expansion plans became public, the MGM Macau announced its own plans for expansion, only weeks after the project was publicly launched.  The expansion will add  to the casino floor's 2nd level. The additional space allows 70 more game tables and 240 slot machines added.

Gallery

See also
 Gambling in Macau

References

External links 

 

Casinos in Macau
Resorts in Macau
Macau Peninsula
Casinos completed in 2007
Hotel buildings completed in 2007
Skyscrapers in Macau
Hotels in Macau
MGM Resorts International
2007 establishments in Macau
Skyscraper hotels in Macau